di Pietro or Di Pietro is an Italian surname. Notable people with the surname include:

 14-15th Century Painters
 Angelo di Pietro da Siena (active 1447–1456), Italian Renaissance painter
 Cecco di Pietro (14th century), Italian painter of the Pisan School
 Cola di Pietro (active late 14th-century), Italian painter of the late Gothic style, active in the Marche and Umbria regions
 Innocenzo di Pietro Francucci da Imola (c.1494–1550), Italian painter
 Matteo di Pietro di Ser Bernardo (1435 or 1440-1507), Italian painter, active in Gualdo Tadino
 Michelangelo di Pietro (active 1490-1520), Italian painter and  Master of the Lathrop Tondo
 Niccolò di Pietro (late 14th-early 15th century), italian Sienese School painter of Medieval art
 Niccolò di Pietro Gerini (c.1340–1414), Italian painter
 Nicola di Pietro (14th century), Italian painter
 Sano di Pietro (1406–1481), Italian painter

 16th  century and following
 Angelo Di Pietro (1828–1914), Italian cardinal
 Angelo Di Pietro (inventor) (born 1950), Italian engine designer
 Anthony Di Pietro (born 1969), Italian Australian businessman
 Antonio Di Pietro (born 1950), Italian politician
 Bruno Barros di Pietro (born 1982), Brazilian football defender
 Camillo di Pietro (1806–1884), Italian cardinal
 Filippo di Pietro Strozzi (1541-1582), Italian condottiero
 Giovani Battista di Pietro di Stefano Volponi (16th century), Italian painter
 Guido di Pietro (c.1395–1455), Italian painter
 Michele di Pietro (1747–1821), Italian cardinal
 Michele Di Pietro (born 1954), Italian former swimmer
 Niccolò di Pietro Lamberti (c. 1370–1451), Italian sculptor and architect
 Pasquale Di Pietro (born 1894, date of death unknown), Italian racing cyclist
 Paolo Andrea Di Pietro (born 1986), Italian opera singer
 Rick DiPietro (born 1981), American ice hockey player
 Rocco Di Pietro (born 1949), Italian-American composer
 Salvatore di Pietro (1830–1898), Italian Roman Catholic first Bishop and Vicar Apostolic of Belize
 Silvia Di Pietro (born 1993), Italian swimmer

Italian-language surnames
Surnames from given names